Erythranthe filicaulis, known by the common name slender-stemmed monkeyflower, is a species of monkeyflower. It was formerly known as Mimulus filicaulis.

Distribution
Erythranthe filicaulis is endemic to California, where it is known only from the High Sierra Nevada within Mariposa and Tuolumne Counties.

Its habitat includes moist areas such as mountain meadows and habitat with disturbed soil.

Description and habitat
Erythranthe filicaulis can carpet an area with its low-lying pink blooms. This is a hairy annual herb producing a thin, erect stem up to about 30 centimeters tall. The oppositely arranged linear to oval leaves are up to about 2 centimeters long.

The tubular base of the flower is encapsulated in a ribbed, red-dotted calyx of sepals with pointed lobes. The corolla of the flower is not distinctly divided into an upper and lower lip, but it has five rounded, notched lobes. The corolla is pink with a deeper pink to purple throat with a prominent yellow spot on the raised folds of the lower lobes. Its bloom period is April to August, depending on elevation.

References

External links
Calflora: Mimulus filicaulis
Jepson Manual eFlora (TJM2) treatment of Mimulus filicaulis
USDA Plants Profile for Mimulus filicaulis
UC CalPhotos gallery − Mimulus filicaulis

filicaulis
Endemic flora of California
Flora of the Sierra Nevada (United States)
Natural history of Mariposa County, California
Natural history of Tuolumne County, California
Flora without expected TNC conservation status